In numerical analysis, Gauss–Hermite quadrature is a form of Gaussian quadrature for approximating the value of integrals of the following kind:

In this case

where n is the number of sample points used.  The xi are the roots of the physicists' version of the Hermite polynomial Hn(x) (i = 1,2,...,n), and the associated weights wi are given by

Example with change of variable
Consider a function h(y), where the variable y is Normally distributed:  . The expectation of h corresponds to the following integral:

As this does not exactly correspond to the Hermite polynomial, we need to change variables:

Coupled with the integration by substitution, we obtain:

leading to:

References

External links
 For tables of Gauss-Hermite abscissae and weights up to order n = 32 see http://www.efunda.com/math/num_integration/findgausshermite.cfm.
 Generalized Gauss–Hermite quadrature, free software in C++, Fortran, and Matlab

Numerical integration (quadrature)
Estimation methods